Weeden may refer to:

People
 Bert Weeden (1882–1939), American minor league baseball player and manager who played one day in Major League Baseball
 Brandon Weeden (born 1983), American National Football League quarterback
 Carl A. Weeden, American navy officer
 Laurie Weeden, Australian curler
 Lasse Weeden, American-Norwegian bass player, former member of Bigbang (Norwegian band)
 Maria Howard Weeden (1846–1905), American artist and author
 Bill Weeden (born 1940), American actor and writer
 Michael Weeden (born 1991), American politician
 Timothy Weeden (born 1951), American politician

Other uses
 , US Navy destroyer escort named in honor of Carl A. Weeden
 Weeden Mountain, south of Huntsville, Alabama, United States
 Weeden Elementary School, a public school in Florence, Alabama, United States
 Weeden Heights Primary School, a school in Vermont South, Victoria, Australia
 Weedens, Wisconsin, an unincorporated community

See also
 Weedon (disambiguation)